M. E. Aldrich Rope (Margaret Edith Rope) (29 July 1891 – 9 March 1988) was an English stained-glass artist in the Arts and Crafts movement tradition active between 1910 and 1964. She was a cousin of Margaret Agnes Rope of Shrewsbury, another English stained glass artist in the same tradition active from 1910 until the Second World War. By comparison, she was the more prolific as an artist, with an approach that evolved in her later years from a recognisable Arts and Crafts school style into something simpler and more modern.

Life
Margaret Agnes Rope and Margaret Edith Rope were cousins, sharing a grandfather, George Rope of Grove Farm, Blaxhall, Suffolk (1814–1912) and grandmother, Anne (née Pope) (1821–1882). The younger Margaret was the fifth child of Arthur Mingay Rope (himself George and Anne's fifth child: 1850–1945) and Agnes Maud (née Aldrich: 1855–1943), born on 29 July 1891. She had a number of artistic relatives in Leiston and Blaxhall, Suffolk. Apart from her cousin Margaret Agnes Rope, she had an uncle, George Thomas Rope, R. A., a landscape painter and naturalist, an aunt Ellen Mary Rope, sculptor, and a sister Dorothy, another sculptor. Another cousin was Henry Edward George Rope, later to become a prominent Roman Catholic priest, writer and archivist. Her nickname in the family was "Tor", for tortoise, and she used a tortoise to sign some of her windows, particularly in her later years. 

Rope was educated at Wimbledon High School, Chelsea School of Art, and the LCC Central School of Arts and Crafts, where she specialised in stained glass under Karl Parsons and Alfred Drury. From about 1911 she worked at The Glass House (Fulham) with her cousin, Margaret Agnes Rope, for example on the set of windows for SS Peter and Paul, Newport, Shropshire. To distinguish herself from her namesake cousin, she used the professional name of M. E. Aldrich Rope (incorporating her mother's maiden name) or M. E. A. Rope. One of her friends was J. Harold Gibbons (church architect) and this connection led to her first major commission for St Chad's Church, Far Headingley, Leeds, which is among her greatest works.

Rope joined the Women’s Land Army in World War I.

For much of her active artistic life she lived in various houses in Deodar Road, Putney, which was something of an artists' colony in that period. Around 1926 she moved to No. 61, also occupied by stained glass artists Caroline Townshend and Joan Howson. She was a close friend of stained glass artist Wilhelmina Geddes. 

Later, during World War II, she moved to No. 81, until it was bombed. She also cared for evacuee children at three hospitals in North Wales during World War II with Townshend & Howson, before moving to Storrington in Sussex.

In the post-war period she was at No. 89, where she had a studio, workshop and kiln (also used by Rachel de Montmorency). She shared the house with Clare Dawson, a friend and pupil. Late in life, she became a Roman Catholic. In mid-1978, at the age of 87, she left Putney and returned to live in Suffolk on the family farm. She died on 9 March 1988, aged 96, having suffered a protracted period of Alzheimer's disease.

Works
Spanning a period of over 50 years, her artistic production was largely destined for Anglican churches (especially Anglo-Catholic), with a few Roman Catholic ones as well. Listed first are windows in the United Kingdom, followed by those in other countries, in alphabetical order of county or country. Inaccessible windows have been omitted. Asterisks indicate windows of particular importance.

Gallery

References

Further reading
Peter Cormack: Women Stained Glass Artists of the Arts and Crafts Movement: catalogue of an exhibition at the William Morris Gallery, published by London Borough of Waltham Forest Libraries and Arts Department, 1985.

External links
Suffolk Artists - ROPE, Margaret Edith
ROPE Margaret Edith Aldrich 1891-1988 |Artist Biographies
Margaret Rope stained glass
Stained Glass Windows for a Firm

English stained glass artists and manufacturers
Australian stained glass artists and manufacturers
Arts and Crafts movement artists
20th-century English artists
1891 births
1988 deaths
People from Leiston
20th-century British women artists